Paul Fielding (born 4 December 1955) is a former English  footballer who played as a midfielder. 

He began his professional football career with Rochdale, where he played for four seasons before being released by the club in 1976.

He was then signed for Sligo Rovers by manager Billy Sinclair and went on to enjoy a successful career in Ireland with Rovers along with spells at other Irish clubs.

References

1955 births
Living people
English footballers
Association football midfielders
Rochdale A.F.C. players
Sligo Rovers F.C. players
English Football League players